Seema may refer to:

Films
Seema (1955 film), a Hindi film
Seema (1971 film), a Hindi film

People
Seema (given name), an Indian feminine name used in South Asia
Seema (actress) (born 1951), Indian actress
Lehlohonolo Seema (born 1980), football (soccer) player from Lesotho
Seema Aissen Weatherwax (1905–2006), Ukrainian-born American photographer

Other uses
Seema or masu salmon, Oncorhynchus masou, a species of fish from Eastern Asia

See also
 Sema (disambiguation)
 Sima (disambiguation)
 Cima (disambiguation)